The 2023 Taraba State gubernatorial election will take place on 18 March 2023, to elect the Governor of Taraba State, concurrent with elections to the Taraba State House of Assembly as well as twenty-seven other gubernatorial elections and elections to all other state houses of assembly. The election will be held two weeks after the presidential election and National Assembly elections. Incumbent PDP Governor Darius Ishaku is term-limited and cannot seek re-election to a third term.

Party primaries were scheduled for between 4 April and 9 June 2022 with the Peoples Democratic Party nominating Kefas Agbu on 25 May while the All Progressives Congress nominated Senator for Taraba South Emmanuel Bwacha on 26 May. Two prolonged court battles challenged the APC primary with one case successfully nullifying the primary through a High Court ruling on 14 November 2022; however, the other case reached higher courts faster and culminated in the Supreme Court also nullifying the primary on 1 February 2023 before ordering a rerun to be conducted. The APC conducted a new primary on 10 February that resulted in Bwacha winning again.

Electoral system
The Governor of Taraba State is elected using a modified two-round system. To be elected in the first round, a candidate must receive the plurality of the vote and over 25% of the vote in at least two-thirds of state local government areas. If no candidate passes this threshold, a second round will be held between the top candidate and the next candidate to have received a plurality of votes in the highest number of local government areas.

Background
Taraba State is a diverse, agriculture-based state in the Middle Belt that has faced challenges in security as inter-ethnic violence and conflict between herders and farmers heavily affect the state. The overproliferation of weaponry and increased pressure for land along with failures in governance led to the worsening of these clashes in the years ahead of the election.

Politically, the 2019 elections were a mixed bag for both major parties. On the federal level, PDP nominee Atiku Abubakar narrowly won the state but it swung slightly towards Buhari; legislatively, the parties fairly evenly split the Senate seats and won House of Representatives seats. Statewise, Ishaku won re-election by a wide margin and the PDP won a majority in the House of Assembly. At the beginning of Ishaku's second term, he vowed to improve state revenue, revitalise agriculture, and develop security. In terms of his performance, Ishaku was criticized for the initial failure of a 2019 peace meeting between Tiv and Jukun groups and his prolonged absence from the state in 2020.

Primary elections
The primaries, along with any potential challenges to primary results, were to take place between 4 April and 3 June 2022 but the deadline was extended to 9 June. According to some candidates and community groups, an informal zoning gentlemen's agreement sets the Taraba North Senatorial District to have the next governor as no governor has come from the North since 2007. However, no major party officially closed zoned their nominations to non-northerners and both ended up nominating southerners.

All Progressives Congress 

On the primary date, disputes over the direct primary method and the shooting of a primary committee member forced the committee to suspend the primary. After the primary continued and completed on 27 May, Senator Emmanuel Bwacha was declared victor with over 97,000 votes, about 61%; Bwacha called for party unity in his acceptance speech. In July, Bwacha selected Iliyasu Kirim—from Karim Lamido in the northern district—as his running mate. Kirim also called for party unity after the nomination. However, David Sabo Kente—a losing aspirant—rejected the results and approached the judiciary for an annulment; on 20 September, a Federal High Court sitting in Jalingo sided with Kente and ordered a new primary to be conducted based on electoral irregularities. The lawsuit of another aspirant—Senator Yusuf Abubakar Yusuf—ended with a High Court sitting in Abuja also voiding the primary on 14 November. Bwacha initiated an appeal against the Jalingo High Court ruling and vowed to also appeal the Abuja High Court ruling. Although the Abuja High Court case remained in litigation, Jalingo High Court case also continued with a Court of Appeal judgment on 24 November relegitimizing the primary. However, Kente appealed that ruling to the Supreme Court which sided with him in a 1 February judgment that definitively ordered a new primary to be held within fourteen days. Kante lauded the court ruling and asked his supporters to await the response of the national party while Bwacha's camp expressed confidence that he would win the rerun. However, the national party did not publicly order a new primary until 9 February, when it communicated to the aspirants that the primary would be held on the next day in Jalingo. The process was disputed by candidates other than Bwacha, who boycotted the exercise and vowed to return to court. In the rerun direct primary, Bwacha won again by a similarly wide margin.

Nominated 
 Emmanuel Bwacha: Senator for Taraba South (2011–present) and former Commissioner for Agriculture
 Running mate—Iliyasu Kirim

Eliminated in primary 
 David Sabo Kente: member of the Northeast Development Commission (2019–present), 2019 APC gubernatorial aspirant, and 2015 SDP gubernatorial nominee
 Danladi Kifasi: former civil servant
 Saleh Mamman: former Minister of Power (2019–2021)
 Anthony George Manzo: former Senator for Taraba North (2007–2011)
 Muhammad Sani Yahaya: 2019 APC gubernatorial aspirant and professor (defected after the primary to successfully run in the NNPP gubernatorial primary)
 Yusuf Abubakar Yusuf: Senator for Taraba Central (2015–present)

Withdrew 
 Ezekiel Afukonyo: Chairman of the Board of Nnamdi Azikiwe University Teaching Hospital and 2019 APC gubernatorial aspirant

Declined 
 Abubakar Sani Danladi: 2019 APC gubernatorial nominee and former Senator for Taraba North
 Garba Umar: 2019 APC gubernatorial aspirant and former Acting Governor (2012–2013)

Results

People's Democratic Party 
In early 2022, state PDP Chairman Kefas Agbu said that the party would adhere to zoning to the North with later reports stating that both Agbu and Ishaku were against a nominee coming from the South as Ishaku himself is Southern. However, Agbu later said that while the party's position was that the ticket should go to a northerner, the zoning would only be unofficial and aspirants from other regions would not be prevented from contesting. Also, Agbu was criticized for accompanying candidate Victor Bala Kona to purchase his nomination forms along with Ishaku's senatorial forms; the appearance created an assumption that both Agbu and Ishaku were supporting Bala Kona.

Ahead of the primary, there were rumors that Agbu had secretly purchased nomination forms himself; Agbu, from Taraba South, denied the rumors and claimed that his candidacy would go against zoning. However, in the days before the primary, reports emerged that former minister and de facto Taraba PDP leader Theophilus Danjuma planned on imposing Agbu as the nominee. On primary day, the plan was enacted as Agbu suddenly emerged as a candidate and easily won the primary by an 80% margin of victory amid protests from other candidates. In the weeks following the primary, two defeated candidates—Jerome Nyame and Hilkiah BubaJoda Mafindi—separately asked courts to disqualify Agbu because Agbu had not purchased forms. This legal situation changed in August when the defeated aspirants coalesced around Nyame's suit as Mafindi and Joseph Albasu Kunini joined as interested parties. However, the cases were dismissed on 20 September by a High Court then on 25 November by a Court of Appeal. By February 2023, the case reached the Supreme Court which also dismissed the case based on technicalities.

Nominated 
 Kefas Agbu: former state PDP Chairman and former Chairman of the Nigerian Maritime Administration and Safety Agency
 Running mate—Aminu Abdullahi Alkali

Eliminated in primary 
 Aminu Ayuba Kotolo: former state Accountant-General
 Victor Bala Kona: former Taraba State PDP Chairman (2012–2020)
 Joel Danlami Ikenya: 2019 APGA Taraba South senatorial nominee, former Minister of Labour and Productivity (2014–2015), and former Senator for Taraba South (2007–2011)
 Joseph Albasu Kunini: House of Assembly member for Lau (2011–present) and Speaker of the House of Assembly (2019–present)
 Hilkiah BubaJoda Mafindi: former Chairman of the State Planning Commission
 Jerome Nyame: entrepreneur and brother of former Governor Jolly Nyame

Withdrew 
 Damian Dodo: lawyer

Results

Minor parties 

 Hamman Muhammed Mbali (Accord)
Running mate: Mohammed Isa
 Abubakar Sadiq Gambo (Action Alliance)
Running mate: Oliver Ndi Mayuka
 Hamman Abubakar Mustapha (Action Democratic Party)
Running mate: Bako Mairiga Mamman
 Danjuma Umaru (Action Peoples Party)
Running mate: Matakitswen Shekarau Masaibi
 David Charima (African Action Congress)
Running mate: Shuaibu Abbo Usman
 Muhammad A. Ibrahim (African Democratic Congress)
Running mate: Emmanuel K. Isuwa
 Gideon Wunuji Adda (Allied Peoples Movement)
Running mate: Anas Dodo Adamu
 Sunday Fudemure Manu (All Progressives Grand Alliance)
Running mate: Musa Samaila
 Kabiru Bala (Boot Party)
Running mate: Adamu Nawukari Sonweh
 Joel Danlami Ikenya (Labour Party)
Running mate: Mohammed Ibrahim Lau
 Muhammad Sani Yahaya (New Nigeria Peoples Party)
Running mate: Danladi Yakubu Balutu
 Ibrahim Sani (National Rescue Movement)
Running mate: Elijah Amamji
 Josiah Wukari Wasa (People's Redemption Party)
Running mate: Suleiman Ahmed Nyakos
 Danladi Baido (Social Democratic Party)
Running mate: Ahmadu Dattijo
 Sa'adu Abubakar Hassan (Young Progressives Party)
Running mate: Tsokojo Daniel Tsokojo
 Bello Adamu (Zenith Labour Party)
Running mate: Samaila Andeze

Campaign
As the general election campaign began in June 2022, pundits focused on the major candidates' attempts to reconcile aggrieved members of their own parties in the wake of contentious party primaries. While the APC primary was also disputed, the sudden emergence of Agbu as a PDP candidate was seen as a betrayal as some party members especially due to the previous assurances from Agbu that the plot was not true. It was also noted that both parties disregarded the zoning principle by picking nominees from the southern district instead of the northern district. Again, this controversy was less impactful in the APC as the party had fully opened its primary to all contenders but in the PDP, both Ishaku and then-state party chairman Agbu had promised to nominate a northerner. In the APC, the controversy centered around the primary conduct itself as analysts expect runners-up to leave the party or refuse to support Bwacha.

As campaigning continued into August 2022, the PDP was still beset by primary disputes as the aggrieved aspirants coalesced behind a single lawsuit challenging Agbu's nomination. Another factor was the presidential pardon of corrupt former Governor Jolly Nyame; his release in August swiftly led to speculation on which gubernatorial candidate he would support with a focus on Agbu, Bwacha, and SDP nominee Danladi Baido. However, the next month brought a new surprise to the race as Bwacha was removed as APC nominee by a court ruling that annulled its primary. Although the party immediately appealed the ruling, the judgment renewed the APC internal crisis with former aspirants calling for a new primary to be conducted. Although the initial annulment was overturned in late November, the APC crisis had only intensified after another court ruled the primary invalid earlier that month. By February, the initial case reached the Supreme Court which ordered the APC to hold a new primary within fourteen days. On 10 February, the party again nominated Bwacha by a wide margin but similarly to the original primary, other aspirants rejected the process.

On 25 February, the presidential election in the state was won by Atiku Abubakar of the PDP. Not long afterwards, the state Christian Association of Nigeria chapter endorsed Agbu in a move that analysts labeled as potentially impactful. Pundits also noted the impacts of NNPP nominee Muhammad Sani Yahaya and LP nominee Joel Danlami Ikenya in the final stretch of campaigning in addition to ethnic and religious identity politics.

Projections

Conduct

Electoral timetable

General election

Results

By senatorial district 
The results of the election by senatorial district.

By federal constituency
The results of the election by federal constituency.

By local government area 
The results of the election by local government area.

See also 
 2023 Nigerian elections
 2023 Nigerian gubernatorial elections

Notes

References 

Taraba State gubernatorial election
2023
2023 Taraba State elections
Taraba